Ada Elene Brown (born November 8, 1974) is a United States district judge of the United States District Court for the Northern District of Texas. She is a former trial judge of the Dallas County courts and a former Justice of the Fifth Court of Appeals of Texas. She is the first African-American woman federal judge nominated by President Donald Trump and confirmed by the Senate. She is also the first African American woman to sit as a federal judge in the 140- year-history of the Northern District of Texas. A citizen of the Choctaw Nation, Brown is also one of six actively serving Native American federal judges of 673 federal district court judges. When appointed to the federal bench, Brown became the only woman judge in the 233-year history of the Choctaw Nation  to serve as a federal judge.

Early life and education 
Ada Elene Brown was born on November 8, 1974 in Oklahoma City, Oklahoma. She graduated as a valedictorian of her high school class, where she was elected both sophomore and junior class president.<ref name="auto1"/ She earned her Bachelor of Arts, magna cum laude, from Spelman College, and her Juris Doctor from Emory University School of Law, both in Atlanta, Georgia. Brown is a member of Mensa and is trilingual. She is African American and Native American.

Legal career

Criminal law practice 

Brown began her career practicing criminal law. She served as a trial prosecutor at the Dallas County District Attorney's Office, where she tried over 100 jury trials to verdict as lead prosecutor.  During this time, she became a felony trial prosecutor and prosecuted murders, rapes, kidnappings, and other felony crimes. She was known for taking on complex and controversial cases. She specialized in prosecuting felony internet crimes against children. In 2005, Brown was one of 2.5% of attorneys under 40 selected by Super Lawyers magazine as a Rising Star in criminal prosecution. Brown left the Dallas County District Attorney’s office to become a district court judge.

Civil law practice 

After leaving the trial bench, Brown practiced as a civil litigator at McKool Smith in Dallas, Texas, where her practice focused on high-stakes commercial litigation and complex patent infringement matters. 
 While there, she tried cases that resulted in some of the largest jury trial verdicts in the nation. 

In a representative case, she presented evidence for plaintiffs about the technology of the ’350 patent to the jury in the Versata Development Group, Inc. v. SAP America, Inc. trial, where the jury awarded $345 million to her client, Versata. This award was increased to $391 million on final judgment. This was the 10th largest jury verdict in the US for 2011.

Brown also presented plaintiff's evidence of damages to the jury in the Medtronic v. Boston Scientific patent infringement trial, where Boston Scientific was found to have infringed Medtronic's ’364, ’358, and ’057 patents. The jury returned a $250 million verdict in favor of her client. This was the 12th largest jury verdict in the US for 2008.

In 2012 and 2013, Brown was one 2.5% of attorneys under 40 selected by Super Lawyers magazine as a Rising Star in commercial litigation.

Law enforcement commissioner 

Brown was appointed by Texas Governor Rick Perry to serve as a Commissioner for the Texas Commission on Law Enforcement Officer Standards and Education, the regulatory agency responsible for licensing all police officers in Texas. Perry later appointed Brown as a Commissioner for the Texas Department of Public Safety, one of 5 people responsible for overseeing a $2.3 billion biennial budget and 10,000+ employees, including the legendary Texas Ranger Division as well as all state troopers in the Texas Highway Patrol.

Honors 

When she ended her service as a Commissioner for the Texas Department of Public Safety to become an appellate court judge, Governor Rick Perry awarded her the Yellow Rose of Texas Award. Brown was also named an Honorary Captain of the Texas Rangers by the Texas Department of Public Safety.

Brown has also been honored by the Dallas Bar Association as a Living Legend. Additionally, she  has also been honored by the Dallas Black Women Lawyers’ Association as the recipient of the club’s Charlye O. Farris Award, named for Texas’ first African-American female woman lawyer.

Judicial career

State judicial service 

Brown served as a trial judge of the Dallas County Criminal District Court, before leaving the bench to join McKool Smith. When Brown was appointed to serve as a trial judge at age 30, she was then the youngest sitting judge in Texas. As a trial judge, she was reversed just once by a higher court.

On September 3, 2013, Governor Rick Perry appointed her to serve as a Justice on the Fifth Court of Appeals of Texas, Texas' largest and busiest intermediate appellate court. At the time of her appointment to the Fifth Court of Appeals of Texas, at age 38, she was then the youngest sitting appellate court justice in Texas.

Brown served on the Fifth Court of Appeals of Texas for six years, during which time she heard over 1,500 civil and criminal appeals. She resigned from the Fifth Court of Appeals of Texas upon her appointment to the United States District Court for the Northern District of Texas.

Federal judicial service 

On March 15, 2019, President Donald Trump announced his intent to nominate Brown to serve as a United States district judge for the United States District Court for the Northern District of Texas. On March 26, 2019, her nomination was sent to the Senate. Ada Brown was nominated to the seat vacated by Judge Terry R. Means, who assumed senior status on July 3, 2013. On April 30, 2019, a hearing on her nomination was held before the Senate Judiciary Committee. On June 13, 2019, her nomination was reported out of committee by an 18–4 vote. On July 30, 2019, the United States Senate invoked cloture on her nomination by a 79–9 vote. On September 11, 2019, her nomination was confirmed by an 80–13 vote. She received her judicial commission on September 13, 2019.

Brown was unanimously rated well-qualified by the American Bar Association.

Brown was featured in a video for the Choctaw Nation of Oklahoma. She also talked about her path to the federal bench in a SCOTUS 101 podcast.

Brown was the first African-American woman appointed to a bench in the United States District Court for the Northern District of Texas in its 140-year existence. She is also the first African-American woman Article III federal judge nominated by President Donald Trump and confirmed by the Senate, and one of 6 Native women in U.S. history to sit on the federal bench.

Memberships 

Brown is a member of Mensa, Daughters of the American Revolution, the Mayflower Society, and the Federalist Society. Brown joined Alpha Kappa Alpha sorority while at Spelman College. She is also a member of the Choctaw Nation of Oklahoma.

See also 
 List of African-American federal judges
 List of African-American jurists
 List of Native American jurists

References

External links 
 
 

1974 births
Living people
20th-century American lawyers
21st-century American lawyers
21st-century American judges
20th-century Native Americans
21st-century Native Americans
Choctaw Nation of Oklahoma people
African-American judges
African-American women lawyers
African-American lawyers
American people of Muscogee descent
Daughters of the American Revolution people
Emory University School of Law alumni
Federalist Society members
Native American judges
Native American lawyers
Judges of the United States District Court for the Northern District of Texas
Mensans
Lawyers from Oklahoma City
Spelman College alumni
Texas lawyers
Texas Republicans
Texas state court judges
United States district court judges appointed by Donald Trump
20th-century American women lawyers
21st-century American women lawyers
21st-century American women judges
20th-century Native American women
21st-century Native American women